Bozar is an unincorporated community in Mills County, Texas, United States.

History
Bozar had a store and a station on the Gulf, Colorado and Santa Fe Railway as late as 1936. In 2000, Bozar's population was nine.

Geography
Bozar is located on U.S. Route 84 and U.S. Route 183 midway between Goldthwaite and Mullin. Lake Merritt is also located near the community.

Education
Bozar is served by the Goldthwaite Independent School District.

References

Unincorporated communities in Mills County, Texas
Unincorporated communities in Texas